This list encompasses students of the Swedish naturalist Carl Linnaeus (1707–1778), professor of medicine at Uppsala University from 1741 until 1777, who laid the foundations for the modern scheme of taxonomy and also had a deep indirect influence through his many students.

Individuals in bold italics were Apostles of Linnaeus, Linnaeus' most promising and committed students who made botanical expeditions to various places in the world.

A-F 
Erik Acharius
Adam Afzelius
Carl Fredrik Adler
Johann Beckmann
Andreas Berlin
Anders Dahl
Jonas Carlsson Dryander
Jakob Friedrich Ehrhart
Johan Christian Fabricius
Johan Peter Falk
Peter Forsskål

G-Q 

Leonard Gyllenhaal
Birger Martin Hall
Fredric Hasselquist
Pehr Kalm
Johann Gerhard König
Adam Kuhn
Pehr Löfling
Erik Gustaf Lidbeck
Anton Rolandsson Martin
Pehr Osbeck

R-Z 

Daniel Rolander
Göran Rothman
Daniel Solander
Anders Erikson Sparrman
Christopher Tärnström
Peter Gustaf Tengmalm
Carl Peter Thunberg
Anders Tidström
Olof Torén
Martin Vahl
Johan Gustav Wahlbom 1724–1808

See also
 Peter Artedi (1705–1735), naturalist and friend of Linnaeus, called "the father of Ichthyology".

Carl Linnaeus
Linnaeus, Students
 List of Students of Linnaeus
Students of Linnaeus